Klaus Ebbighausen (born 1941) is a former German football manager.

Playing career
Born in Osterode am Harz, Ebbighausen began his career at fellow Niedersachsen-based clubs Arminia Hannover and Hannover 96 as a youth player. Following his education, Ebbighausen played senior football for Karlsruher SC, FT Braunschweig and Bayern Kickers Nürnberg.

Managerial career
Following his retirement, Ebbighausen moved into coaching. In 1976, he joined the Sierra Leone national football team as manager. Following his spell at Sierra Leone, Ebbighausen coached in Sudan, Nigeria and Pakistan. In 1980, Ebbighausen managed Somalia in their 1982 FIFA World Cup qualification attempts, exiting in the first round on away goals against Niger.

In 1982, Ebbighausen moved to Thailand, coaching the country's youth teams. In 1983, Ebbighausen moved to South Africa for three years in a scouting capacity. In 1987, Ebbighausen was appointed manager of Ethiopia. The country did not contest qualification for the 1990 FIFA World Cup during his tenure. Ebbighausen later coached in Malawi, Gambia and Laos. Ebbighausen helped Sudan's under-17's to qualify for the 1991 FIFA U-17 World Championship as well as managing Vietnamese club Long An. Ebbighausen worked as a youth coach in India and Bhutan, before his retirement in 2000.

References

1941 births
Living people
People from Osterode am Harz
German footballers
German football managers
Karlsruher SC players
Sierra Leone national football team managers
Somalia national football team managers
Ethiopia national football team managers
West German expatriate sportspeople in Sudan
West German expatriate sportspeople in Nigeria
West German expatriate sportspeople in Pakistan
West German expatriate sportspeople in South Africa
West German expatriate sportspeople in Sierra Leone
German expatriate sportspeople in the Gambia
German expatriate sportspeople in Malawi
West German expatriate sportspeople in Thailand
German expatriate sportspeople in India
West German expatriate sportspeople in Ethiopia
Association football coaches
Association football defenders
Association football scouts
West German expatriate sportspeople in Somalia
Expatriate football managers in Somalia
Expatriate football managers in India
Expatriate football managers in Sierra Leone
Expatriate football managers in Malawi
Expatriate football managers in Pakistan
Expatriate football managers in Sudan
Expatriate soccer managers in South Africa
Expatriate football managers in Thailand
Expatriate football managers in Ethiopia
Expatriate football managers in the Gambia
Expatriate football managers in Nigeria
Footballers from Lower Saxony
West German footballers
West German football managers
West German expatriate football managers